Giovanni Battista Brescia (died 1660) was a Roman Catholic prelate who served as Bishop of Vicenza (1655–1660).

Biography
On 14 June 1655, Giovanni Battista Brescia was appointed during the papacy of Pope Alexander VII as Bishop of Vicenza.
On 4 July 1655, he was consecrated bishop by Marcantonio Bragadin, Cardinal-Priest of San Marco, with Pier Luigi Carafa (bishop), Bishop of Tricarico, and Girolamo Farnese, Titular Archbishop of Patrae, serving as co-consecrators. 
He served as Bishop of Vicenza until his death in 1660.

References

External links and additional sources
 (for Chronology of Bishops) 
 (for Chronology of Bishops) 

17th-century Italian Roman Catholic bishops
Bishops appointed by Pope Alexander VII
1660 deaths